Piero "Pete" Harris (April 7, 1957 – August 9, 2006) was an American football player.

Biography
One of nine children, Harris grew up in Mount Holly, New Jersey, and played high school football at Rancocas Valley Regional High School. He was named an All-American safety at Penn State University in 1978, when he led the nation with 10 interceptions. He is the younger brother of Pro Football Hall of Famer Franco Harris.
 
Harris died in West Palm Beach, Florida. At the time of his death, he was executive chef at PGA National Resort and Spa in Palm Beach Gardens, Florida.

References

1957 births
2006 deaths
American people of Italian descent
People from Mount Holly, New Jersey
American football safeties
Penn State Nittany Lions football players
Players of American football from New Jersey
Rancocas Valley Regional High School alumni
Sportspeople from Burlington County, New Jersey